Thomasia triphylla  is a small shrub that is endemic to the south-west of Western Australia. The flowers are pinkish-purple, bell-shaped and hang in pendents from the leaf axils.

Description
Flowering may occur in July, August, or spring.

Taxonomy and naming
Thomasia triphylla was first formally described in 1821 by Jacques Etienne Gay and the description was published in Memoires du Museum d'Histoire Naturelle. The specific epithet (triphylla) refers to "the 2 stipules at the base of the petiole are large and leaf like".

Distribution and habitat
This species grows in limestone and sand dunes in coastal areas of south-west Western Australia and several locations from Albany to Esperance.

References

                                                                    

Rosids of Western Australia
triphylla